Kłóbka  is a village in the administrative district of Gmina Lubień Kujawski, within Włocławek County, Kuyavian-Pomeranian Voivodeship, in north-central Poland.

Maria Wodzińska, the artist known especially for having been the fiancée of Frédéric Chopin, spent the later part of her life in Kłóbka.

References

Villages in Włocławek County